Santi López Prats (born 24 March 1975) is an Andorran alpine skier. He competed in the men's super-G at the 1994 Winter Olympics.

Notes

References

External links
 
 
 

1975 births
Living people
Andorran male alpine skiers
Olympic alpine skiers of Andorra
Alpine skiers at the 1994 Winter Olympics